The Cayman Islands women's national cricket team represents the Cayman Islands, a British overseas territory, in international women's cricket. The team is organised by the Cayman Islands Cricket Association, which has been a member of the International Cricket Council (ICC) since 1997.

In April 2018, the ICC granted full Women's Twenty20 International (WT20I) status to all its members. Therefore, all Twenty20 matches played between the Cayman Islands women and another international side after 1 July 2018 will be a full WT20I.

History
Women's cricket in the Cayman Islands was formally revived in 2009, after several years without organised competition. The national team has only participated in one international tournament, which they hosted – the 2012 ICC Americas Women's Twenty20 Championship. At the event, the team lost its first three matches by heavy margins, losing to the United States by 68 runs, Argentina by eight wickets, and Canada by 106 runs. However, the Caymans won their fourth game easily, defeating Brazil by seven wickets in a match that was reduced to 13 overs per side. The team's final match of the tournament, against Bermuda, was washed out, with the Cayman Islands consequently placing fourth on the points table (out of six teams).

See also
 Cricket in the Cayman Islands
 Cayman Islands men's national cricket team

References

Cricket in the Cayman Islands
Cricket women
Women's national cricket teams
Women
Women's sport in the Cayman Islands